Sinan Engin (born 4 November 1964) is a Turkish former footballer, current pundit and TV Personality. Engin spent most part of his career at Istanbul-based Beşiktaş J.K. where he joined in 1974 at junior level. Engin represented Turkey at U18 and U21 levels.

Club career
Sinan Engin recruited in cadets team of Beşiktaş J.K. academy by Serpil Hamdi Tüzün, then-academy manager, in 1974. He was promoted to senior squad in 1981, at the age of 16, by senior team coach Đorđe Milić.

Following a personal issue with manager Gordon Milne, Sinan Engin was loaned out  Kuşadası Gençlik Spor Kulübü at 1988–89 season. Galatasaray S.K. and  Altay S.K. was also interested in Engin, at previous stages of same season. The issue between the two started following an outspoken claim of Engin, stating he was treated unfairly and emotionally kept bench by Milne, saying "I can play with shut eyes at this team". Kuşadasıspor agreed to pay TL100 million to Beşiktaş, as well as buying an apartment and a 1988 model Mercedes car to Engin. Although he was contracted with Kuşadasıspor, he was spotted at a training session of Beşiktaş in April 1989. On 30 June 1989, Engin returned from loan, with a contract renewal summing up TL100 million.

On 21 November 1989, while his Adana Demirspor spell, Engin scored twice against Altay on an away game ended 2–2, taken place in Izmir.

Sinan Engin joined Ankaragücü in 1990–91 transfer window. On 27 September 1992, Engin scored the equalizer in the away game against Fenerbahçe S.K. on 31st minute, ended 2–1. In October 1992, Aydınspor interested in Engin, offered an exchange trade of Engin with a Bulgarian player, which was refused by Ankaragücü. In October 1992, following an incident between club officials and club supporters, Engin announced he has no longer intention to play at Ankaragücü, refusing to join trainings. On 9 February 1993, while playing at Ankaragücü for the 3rd season, he expressed that he would love to return Beşiktaş where he hopes to retire from professional football, in case Gordon Milne approves a potential transfer.

On 9 July 1993, Engin joined another Istanbul side Sarıyer S.K., with a contract worth an apartment in Tarabya, Sarıyer district and TL1.00 billion.

In 1994, at the age of 30, Sinan Engin retired from professional football.

Post playing career
In 2001, Sinan Engin appointed as Team Manager at Beşiktaş, which ended in 2004, due to his alleged relationship, telephone call records with Turkish underground figure Alaattin Çakıcı whom he was alleged to supply travel visa documents using Beşiktaş J.K. letterhead. Engin and Çakıcı allegedly knew each other from their childhood neighbourhood in Istanbul.

Engin joined the Turkish TV8 football weekly review show "3. Devre". Engin returned to Beşiktaş at same title, Team Manager, between 2006 and 2008. On 27 May 2009, he quit punditry from weekly football review show "Telegol" at Kanal Türk and joined Manisaspor as Team Manager.

In 2011, he joined "Beyaz TV", a local broadcaster for punditry at weekly shows "Beyaz Futbol" and "Derin Futbol", along with former referee Ahmet Çakar.

In November 2020, Engin had a cameo appearance at Turkish TV series Çukur, aired on Show TV.

Personal life
Sinan Engin was born in Gültepe, Istanbul to a family from Maçka, Trabzon. He completed his mandatory service to Turkish Army in 1989. Engin was married with Turkish singer and TV personality Seda Sayan between 1990 and 1995. Oğulcan, their only son, was born in 1990; who had a respectively shorter professional football career than his father, played at Kasımpaşa S.K. at 2010–11 Süper Lig season under a professional contract and capped twice at U-17 and U-18 level for Turkey.

Engin married Ayşe Engin in 1997. Elif, his second kid, was born in 1997. and studied Law at Galatasaray University.

Stats

Achievements
Beşiktaş J.K.
 Super League (1): 1985-86
 Super League (Runner-up) (3): 1984-85, 1986-87, 1987-88

Filmography and television

Film

Television

References

External links
Profile at Turkish Football Federation
 

1964 births
Living people
Footballers from Istanbul
Association football midfielders
Beşiktaş J.K. footballers
MKE Ankaragücü footballers
Sarıyer S.K. footballers
Süper Lig players
Turkish footballers
Adana Demirspor footballers